Vaandrager is a surname. Notable people with the surname include:

 Cor Vaandrager, Dutch footballer who played for Zwart-Wit '28 (1962–1972)
 Cornelis Bastiaan Vaandrager (1935–1992), Dutch writer and poet
 Wiljon Vaandrager (born 1957), Dutch rower